Def Jam Vendetta is a 2003 professional wrestling video game that combines hip hop with pro wrestling.  It was released for the PlayStation 2 & GameCube by Electronic Arts under the EA Sports BIG label in North America & Europe, and the EA Games label in Japan. It was EA's first attempt at a wrestling game since the widely panned WCW Backstage Assault. Several hip hop artists were featured in the game, including DMX, Method Man, Redman, Ludacris, N.O.R.E.,  Capone, Scarface, Ghostface Killah, Keith Murray, WC, Joe Budden and DJ Funkmaster Flex; all of which at the time were artists of Def Jam. Singer Christina Milian was also featured in the game as "Angel". A sequel, Def Jam: Fight for NY, was released on September 20, 2004, to largely positive reviews.

Gameplay
The game features a largely unmodified AKI engine, used in the company's Virtual Pro Wrestling games and its spinoffs with some minor "button mashing" elements added and more of an arcade than a simulation. The game plays very similarly to WWF No Mercy, and features a lengthy story mode that allows you to level up and enhance one of four player characters in your quest to become the most well known star in the urban fighting league and fight the undefeated underground boss, D-Mob (voiced by actor Christopher Judge).

Players can win in one of three ways; pin, submission or KO. Pins are done by pinning the opponent for 3 seconds before he can kick out. The player can trap opponents in holds that gradually weaken one of their body parts (head, body, legs and arms). This hold can be broken by touching the ropes. If one of those gauges reaches empty, the bones get broken and that player submits & automatically loses. Players can attack their opponent to build up a power gauge, letting them activate 'Blazin' mode. If the player successfully grabs an opponent in this state, he can perform a special move. If the opponent's health is low enough, they will be KO'd.

Characters
The game features 46 playable characters, including real-life hip hop artists signed to Def Jam at the time, as well as original characters. Christina Milian appears as Angel Rodriguez, a non-playable character. Japanese rappers Dabo and S-Word appear exclusively in the game's Japanese release.

Plot
The player has a choice between four street fighters: Briggs, a dishonorably discharged soldier; Proof, an ex-superbike racer; Tank, a massive Japanese fighter, and the DJ Spider, although the story is the same for each of them.

When the player chooses their street fighter, they are then called up to help out their friend Manny by taking his place in a street fight. Once the player wins a certain number of fights, they'll go against the rapper Scarface. Once the player beats his character, they'll get their first girlfriend, Deja. Other girls will come up to the player every couple of street fights, and then eventually, the player will have to choose which one should be the street fighter's new girlfriend, from which they'll all fight each other.

Eventually, N.O.R.E. will challenge The Protagonist to a fight at Grimeyville in LeFrak City, Queens, New York City. Before the fight, The Protagonist arrives and almost gets into a fight with D-Mob (Chris Judge). Not long after the fight, Manny signs The Protagonist and him up for a tag team tournament. After a while, The Protagonist will be challenged by Ludacris to a fight in Club Luda. After the fight, D-Mob claims that The Protagonist and Manny are nothing. He says that if anyone in the club wants the power and respect, they have to beat him at the Def Jam tournament. Manny tells The Protagonist to stop fighting, but he ignores him.

DMX challenges The Protagonist but first the character has to overcome The Dragon House's offer. Once they have done that, they take on Method Man and Redman in the finale of the tag team tournament. After that, The Protagonist fights DMX. Once The Protagonist wins, they receive an email from Angel (The Protagonist's girlfriend taken by D-Mob) saying that they need to talk. When they arrive at The Face Club, it is revealed that D-Mob has sent House, Pockets and Snowman to stop them from coming to the Def Jam tournament. The Protagonist defeats them, but Manny knocks him out and joins D-Mob against his will. Soon The Protagonist wakes up and enters the tournament and defeat their best fighters. D-Mob then attempts to shoot The Protagonist but Manny takes the bullet and survives. Your character triumphs over D-Mob and gets back Angel. While The Protagonist is walking out, D-Mob is arrested, leading up to the events of Def Jam: Fight for NY.

Reception

By July 2006, the PlayStation 2 version of Def Jam Vendetta had sold 750,000 copies and earned $30 million in the United States. Next Generation ranked it as the 82nd highest-selling game launched for the PlayStation 2, Xbox or GameCube between January 2000 and July 2006 in that country. Combined sales of the Def Jam series reached 1.8 million units in the United States by July 2006.

The Cincinnati Enquirer gave it a score of all four stars and stated: "Electronic Arts deserves kudos for breathing new life into the aging fighting genre with this title's fresh approach". However, The Village Voice gave it a score of six out of ten and said: "If only DMX could sic his pit bulls on you, Funkmaster Flex burst your eardrums ID'ing himself, or Redman burn you with a blunt". Entertainment Weekly gave it a C+ and called it "an uninspired wrestling title that lacks Def Jam's trademark sheen".

GameSpot named Def Jam Vendetta the best PlayStation 2 game of April 2003.

References

External links
  
 

2003 video games
Def Jam video games
EA Sports games
EA Sports Big games
Video games based on musicians
GameCube games
Organized crime video games
PlayStation 2 games
Professional wrestling games
Syn Sophia games
Video games developed in Canada
Video games developed in Japan
Video games featuring black protagonists
Multiplayer and single-player video games
Video games set in New York City
Spike Video Game Award winners